Isabelle Härle (born 10 January 1988) is a German swimmer. Since 2011, she participates in the open water events.

She won the bronze medal at the Team 5 km world championships.

At the 2016 Summer Olympics in Rio de Janeiro, she competed in the women's 10 km marathon swim. She finished in 6th place with a time of 1:57:22.1.

Before the 2016 Summer Olympics in Rio de Janeiro, Härle posed together with rower Julia Lier, cyclist Nadja Pries, table tennis player Petrissa Solja and not starting from injury reasons in Rio pole vaulter Katharina Bauer for the German edition of the Playboy.

References

External links 
 
 
 
 
 

1988 births
Living people
People from Bad Saulgau
Sportspeople from Tübingen (region)
German female swimmers
German female long-distance swimmers
World Aquatics Championships medalists in open water swimming
2010s Playboy Playmates
Swimmers at the 2016 Summer Olympics
Olympic swimmers of Germany
20th-century German women
21st-century German women